Rakiraki F.C. is a Fijian football team playing in the second division of the Fiji Football Association competitions. It is based in Rakiraki, which is situated on the northern side of the main island of Viti Levu. Their home stadium is the Ra Sports Grounds. Their uniform is maroon shirt, white shorts and maroon socks.

History 
Rakiraki F.C. was founded in 1938, with the formation of the Rakiraki Football Association, under the leadership of Edward Raman. It first took part in the Inter-District Competition (IDC) held in Lautoka in 1939, in which it was resoundingly defeated by Suva, in its first game, by nine goals to nil. In 1944, Rakiraki hosted the IDC for the only time. It reached the zenith of its performance when it surprised the other teams to qualify for the 1951 IDC final, which it lost to Suva by two goals to nil. Unlike the other football teams from the western division, Rakiraki performed poorly in the 1970s and 1980s, but it improved in the 1990s and created history in 2003 to win its first IDC in the senior division, winning again in 2004, 2006 and 2007. In the 2003 IDC, held in Govind Park, Rakiraki defeated T/Naitasiri 2–0. In that year Rakiraki had players like Ritesh, Farid, Atinesh, Ganga, Raju, Semi, Robin, Aeseli, Shiu, Shameel Hussein, Shameer, Tevita, Vikash, Atish and was coached by Pragdeesh Gounder (Putty). The team manager was Sani Ram (Sannu) and officials comprised Mohd Rafiq, Kamal Chand Seth, Shaneel, Atesh Maharaj and chairman Sanjeet Maharaj.

Current squad
Squad for the 2018 Inter-District Championship

Achievements 
League Championship (for Districts): 
Winner: 4 2003, 2004, 2006, 2007
Runner-up: 3 2002, 2005, 2008
 Inter-District Championship: 
Winner: 4 2003, 2004, 2006, 2007
Runner-up: 1 1951
Battle of the Giants: 
Winner: 0
Runner-up: 0
Fiji Football Association Cup Tournament: 
Winner: 0
Runner-up: 0

See also 
 Fiji Football Association

References 

Football clubs in Fiji
1938 establishments in Fiji